The R345 is a Regional Route in South Africa that connects Cathcart with Hamburg via Hogsback, Alice and the Double Drift Nature Reserve. It is co-signed with the R63 between Fort Hare and Alice.

Its northern origin is Cathcart at the N6. It passes through Hogsback to reach the R63. The roads run west together to reach Alice. From Alice, the route departs heading south. It then bends south-east to reach the N2. It is cosigned heading south-west, and the routes enter Peddie. At Peddie, the route heads east to the R72. The routes are cosigned heading south, before the R345 is given off to end at the coast at Hamburg.

External links
 Routes Travel Info

References

Regional Routes in the Eastern Cape